Pádraic McCormack (born 15 May 1942) is a former Irish Fine Gael politician, who served as a Teachta Dála (TD) for the Galway West constituency from 1989 to 2011, and as a Senator from 1987 to 1989.
 
McCormack is a native of Kenagh, County Longford, and was educated at St. Mel's College, Longford. He was elected to Seanad Éireann in 1987 by the Agricultural Panel and is also a former member of Galway County Council. He was first elected to the Dáil at the 1989 general election and was re-elected at each subsequent election until his retirement in 2011. Prior to entering politics, he worked as a livestock auctioneer. He was Mayor of Galway from 1992 to 1993. He was Fine Gael deputy spokesman on the environment and local government, with special responsibility for urban renewal and housing policy in the 29th Dáil.

In April 2006, he announced his intention not to seek re-election at the forthcoming general election. However, in December 2006, after the withdrawal of Brian Walsh, the candidate originally selected by Fine Gael to replace him, McCormack announced that he had reconsidered his decision and would after all stand in the general election. He did stand, and in May 2007 he was re-elected on the twelfth of 13 counts, taking the third of Galway West's five seats.

In December 2010, he failed to get a place on Fine Gael ticket in the Galway West constituency for the 2011 general election. He said afterwards that he was not considering being added to the ticket.

References

External links
Henry, William (2002). Role of Honour: The Mayors of Galway City 1485-2001. Galway: Galway City Council.  

 

1942 births
Living people
Fine Gael TDs
Members of the 18th Seanad
Members of the 26th Dáil
Members of the 27th Dáil
Members of the 28th Dáil
Members of the 29th Dáil
Members of the 30th Dáil
Politicians from County Longford
Mayors of Galway
Local councillors in Galway (city)
Local councillors in County Galway
Politicians from County Galway
Fine Gael senators
People educated at St Mel's College